The State Railways of the Republic of Turkey, abbreviated as TCDD, is a government-owned national railway company responsible with the ownership and maintenance of railway infrastructure in Turkey, as well as the planning and construction of new lines. TCDD was formed on 4 June 1929 as part of the nationalisation of railways in Turkey.

The Turkish State Railways own and maintain all public railways in Turkey. This includes railway stations, ports, bridges and tunnels, yards and maintenance facilities. Apart from railway infrastructure, TCDD also owns several rail transport companies within Turkey as well as a 50% share of the İzmir-area commuter rail system, İZBAN.

Prior to 2017, TCDD also operated all railways in Turkey. However, with the government taking steps to privatise some of the Turkish railway network, TCDD Taşımacılık was formed on 14 June 2016 to take over all railway operations. Handover of rolling stock was signed on 28 December of the same year and TCDD formally ceased all railway operations on 31 December 2016.

History

After World War I and the Turkish Independence War, the Republic of Turkey was a new-formed country. Even though Turkey had a railway network, most of it was operated by foreign companies. The State Railways of the Republic of Turkey (TCDD) was formed on 31 May 1927. TCDD took over the Chemin de fer d'Anatolie-Baghdad, a holding company formed in 1924 by Turkey to take over some rail lines in Turkey, on 1 June 1927 and had control over the tracks of the former Anatolian Railway (CFOA) and the Transcaucasus Railway line in Turkish borders. TCDD now had rail lines to the cities İstanbul, İzmit, Ankara, Afyon, Adapazarı and Konya. On 1 January 1929, TCDD took over the rail line from Mersin to Adana (formerly the Mersin-Tarsus-Adana Railway). Apart from taking over already built lines, TCDD needed to build more line because many important cities were still not serviced by rail. In 1926, TCDD started to build a rail line east to Sivas, reaching Kayseri in 1927 and Sivas in 1930. TCDD continued to acquire from the other rail companies; taking over the Mudanya-Bursa Railway in 1931, the Smyrna Cassaba Railway in 1934, the Ottoman Railway Company in 1935 and the Oriental Railway in 1937. With most of the railways in Turkey under TCDD control, TCDD connected lines such as Kütahya with Balıkesir in 1932 and the former SCP line in Afyon with the former CFOA line. In 1932 TCDD completed the railway to Samsun heading north at Sivas. TCDD continued to build lines, reaching Zonguldak, Erzurum, Erzincan, Diyarbakır and Elazığ in the following years. World War II broke out in 1938, slowing down the building. Between 1938 and 1996 TCDD building decreased. The railway only extended to Gaziantep (1955) and Van (1962).

Formerly planned railways
In 1948 the State Railways released a plan of railway lines that were to be constructed to "ensure national progression and safety". The plan included  of new railway lines of which only  were actually completed; the Gaziantep-Karkamış section of the Narlı-Nusaybin railway was completed in 1960.

Operations

The Turkish State Railways operate most trains in the country. Intercity, regional, suburban, freight and most industrial lines are owned and operated by the State Railways. The only other railways in Turkey include İZBAN (TCDD holds 50% of the company's shares) which operates commuter rail service around İzmir and a few other industrial railways. In addition to rail services, TCDD has been responsible since 1927 for operating several major ports which handle 30% of Turkish port activities.

Passenger operations
The Turkish State Railways operate passenger services on 90% of their system. These are intercity, regional, commuter and international services. In the railways first year 52% of passenger travel in Turkey was by rail, despite the system lacking connections to many parts of the country. Rail transport was the main mode of transport for passengers in the following two decades, reaching an all-time high of 57% of passenger transport in 1947, but then started to decline after 1950, due to the mass construction of roads. Today, the passenger ratio is slowly increasing with the opening of high-speed rail lines in Turkey.

In 2019, almost 150 million people traveled by train in Turkey. 17.5 million on main lines, 8.3 million on high speed lines (2% increase compared to 2018) and 124 million used the Marmaray commuter railway. The share of railway in domestic travels in 2013 is about 2.2%.

The types of passenger service are:

High-speed: High-speed rail services and TCDD's premier service.
Mainline: Intercity trains operating between major cities.
International: Trains operating on international routes, toward Europe or the Middle East.
Regional: Trains operating within their respective districts.
Commuter: Commuter trains, currently operating in Ankara and İstanbul.

High-speed services

High-speed rail in Türkiye began service in 2009. TCDD has branded its high-speed service as Yüksek Hızlı Tren or YHT, directly translating to High-Speed Train, dubbed after the trains' capacity to reach 250km/h (and in some advanced sections of the Ankara-Konya railroad up to 300 km/h). There had been previously tried but failed accelerated train projects, i.e. higher speed rail without the necessary upgrades on the railroad tracks, causing a number of accidents and ending up with losses incurred by TCDD in early 2000s. YHT, in stark contrast, became a commercially successful, safe and cheap alternative to Flights and Roads, cutting the travel time between the city centers of two largest cities of the country up to 4 hours. Currently, YHT trains operate 22 daily trips based from its central hub in Ankara, in addition to more trips on the İstanbul-Konya high-speed railway that bypass Ankara.

YHT currently operates on two main lines: the Ankara–Istanbul high-speed railway, and Ankara–Konya high-speed railway. In total, these lines connect 8 provincial capitals out of 81 Provinces in Türkiye, namely Adapazarı (via Arifli), Ankara, Bilecik, Eskişehir, İstanbul, İzmit, Karaman and Konya. There are currently ongoing construction projects aiming to link up at least 6 more provincial capitals, including third and fourth largest cities of the country İzmir and Bursa, besides Afyonkarahisar, Edirne, Kayseri, Sivas and other potential cities. Further ambitions at the planning stage eventually aim to link up East and West points of the country through high-speed railways and act as an international High-speed railway bridge across Europe and Asia

On 13 March 2009, the first phase of the Ankara–Istanbul high-speed railway entered service between Ankara and Eskişehir. On 25 July 2014, the Ankara-Istanbul high-speed line services began to reach the Pendik railway station on the Asian side of Istanbul, and on 13 March 2019 the services began to reach the Halkalı railway station on the European side of Istanbul, passing through the Marmaray railway tunnel under the Bosphorus strait. There were initially 6 daily departures in both directions. The high-speed line between Ankara and Istanbul has reduced the overland travel time to 3 and a half hours, compared to 5 hours by car.

On 23 August 2011, the YHT service on the Ankara–Konya high-speed railway was inaugurated. The Konya-Ankara line was later connected with the İstanbul-Ankara line at the Polatlı district of Ankara Province on 23 March 2013, essentially bypassing the city of Ankara and shortening the distance between İstanbul to Konya to 5 hours. Most recently on 8 January 2022, the Konya line was extended into another provincial capital Karaman.

High-speed rail in Turkey is still developing, with new lines currently under construction or in the planning phase. By 2023, the Ministry of Transport and Infrastructure expects Turkey's high-speed rail system to increase to 10,000 kilometers.

Mainline services

Mainline service is the railway's main service. In 2010 mainline services made up for 24% of the railways passenger traffic. Mainline service includes 2 types of trains: Express and Blue Train.

Express service is between major cities and are fast, comfortable and equipped with modern air conditioned TVS2000 railcars and only stop at important stations. Express service has both day (e.g. İzmir-Bandırma) and overnight trains between major cities far apart (e.g. Ankara-Kars). These trains have coaches, a dining car and a sleeping car or a couchette car or sometimes both.

The TVS2000 railcars used on mainline service are the most comfortable cars in TCDD's entire fleet. TVS2000 railcars may also be used on International services because international services are considered mainline services within Turkey.

International services

International services to Europe

 Istanbul-Sofia Express, to Sofia, Bulgaria via Edirne, Kapıkule railway station, Kapitan Andreevo, Plovdiv, Pazardzhik and Sofia.

 Bosfor Express, to Bucharest, Romania via Edirne, Kapıkule railway station, Kapitan Andreevo, Dimitrovgrad, Ruse, and Bucharest.

International services to Asia 

The Haydarpaşa Terminal is the terminus for a weekly train to Tehran in Iran, another train to Iran travels between Van, Turkey and Tebriz in Iran.

Additionally, trains from Iran to Syria (and vice versa) pass through Turkey.

 Trans-Asia Express, to Tehran, Iran via İzmit, Bilecik, Eskişehir, Ankara, Kayseri, Sivas, Elazığ, Tatvan (train-ferry), Van and Tabriz.

 Van-Tebriz Treni (Van – Tabriz train) Route:  Van, Özalp, Kapıköy, Razi, border crossing to Iran, Salmas, Tabriz (and back.)

Former international services
 Tehran – Damascus Train, route: Tehran, Tabriz, Razi, Kapıköy, border crossing to Turkey, Van, (train-ferry), Tatvan, Muş, Elazığ, Malatya, Fevzipaşa, Islahiye, Meydanekbez, Turkey – border crossing to Syria, (via Chemins de Fer Syriens) – Meidan Ekbis, Aleppo, Damascus (and back.) This service was interrupted when the border between Syria and Turkey was closed due to the Syrian civil war.
Taurus Express (Toros Ekspresi), route: Istanbul: Haydarpaşa Terminal, Eskişehir (Enveriye), Kütahya, Afyon, Konya, Adana, Fevzipaşa, Islahiye, Meydanekbez, border crossing to Syria (via Chemins de Fer Syriens) – Aleppo, Damascus (and back.)
Gaziantep – Baghdad: This service was indefinitely suspended since 13 March 2003 with the invasion of Iraq and the ongoing insurgency. Route: Turkey: Gaziantep, Karkamış, Akçakale, Ceylanpınar, Şenyurt, Nusaybin, border crossing to Syria, Al Qamishli, (via Chemins de Fer Syriens), border crossing to Iraq, El-Yaribieh, Rabia, Mosul, Baghdad. It was also running from Istanbul to Gaziantep as mainline until 2003. It is begun again on 16 August 2012 between Eskişehir-Adana but due to renovations, it's shortened to Konya-Adana route on 15 March 2013.
 Dostluk/Fillia Express (IC 90/91), to Thessaloniki, Greece via Uzunköprü, Pythion and Alexandroupolis. It was terminated in February 2011 due to the economic crisis in Greece.

Regional services

Commuter services

As of 2011, the Turkish State Railways operate commuter rail in İstanbul and Ankara, with previous commuter service in İzmir from up to 2006, which is now operated by İZBAN. The railways use the E14000 and the E23000 EMUs on their commuter services. Previously, the newly retired E8000 EMUs and the E4000 electric locomotives were used as well. The first commuter rail service in Turkey was the İstanbul-Halkalı Line on the European side of İstanbul, operating from Sirkeci Terminal to Halkalı in 1955.

Freight operations

Rail freight transport

From 1980 onwards, rail freight tonne-kilometers transported by the TCDD rose slightly from ≈5000million tonne-km in 1980 to ≈7000million tonne-km in 1990 and to ≈9000million tonne-km in 2000. Approximately 50% of freight moved is minerals or ores, with construction materials increasing to ≈10% in 2000 from less than 5% in 1980, food/agricultural products, chemicals/petroleum, and metal sectors each account for between 5 and 10%. International freight accounted for approximately 5% of totals in 2000.

As of 2012, 25.7 million ton is transported by rail in Turkey. Two steel companies, Erdemir and Kardemir, top 2 customers of TCDD, had transported 4.5 million ton in 2012, mainly iron ore and coal. 2.1 million tons of rail freight belong to international traffic. Most of international traffic is between Turkey and Europe, done via Kapikule. Several container trains are running in this route as well as conventional wagons.

As of 2014, 26.6 million ton is transported on rail in Turkey. 7.1 million of it is done by private wagons. International transport went down to 1.7 million.

Containers are widely used both in international and domestic transportation. 7.6 million ton is carried in containers. TCDD is supporting transportation by containers. Thus almost all of the private railway companies invested in container wagons, and carrying 20% of all rail freight by their own wagons.

TCDD has plans to strengthen freight traffic by adding 4000 km conventional lines until 2023. That includes new international rail connections to Georgia, Iraq and Iran. TCDD is also constructing 18 logistic centers to enable transportation of more loads by rail.

TCDD is planning to increase its transit traffic (11000 to in 2011) by constructing "iron silk road" to connect Europe to Asia. Marmaray is the most important part of this project which was completed in 2015 and now in service. Another project is Kars–Tbilisi–Baku railway which is planned to be completed in 2016 and start functioning in 2017. Also, plans for another supplying project to Kars-Tbilisi-Baku railway, the Kars-Igdir-Nakhcivan high speed railway has been completed. TCDD wants to have share from the freight traffic between Europe and China through this line.

Ports

The State Railways own and operate seven ports throughout the country and has connections to two more ports. The ports TCDD owns are the Port of Haydarpaşa in Istanbul on the southern mouth of the Bosphorus, the Port of Izmir on the Aegean Sea, the Port of Mersin and the Port of İskenderun on the Mediterranean Sea, the Port of Bandırma on the Sea of Marmara, the Port of Derince on the Gulf of İzmit, and the Port of Samsun on the Black Sea. The railways have connections to the Port of Zonguldak, owned by Türkiye Taşkömürü Kurumu (Turkish Coal Company), the Port of Tekkeköy and the Port of Tekirdağ, owned by AKPORT AŞ. In 2004, the privatization of all ports except Haydarpaşa began.

By 2014 Mersin, Iskenderun, Bandirma, Samsun ports are privatized. Tender for privatization of Derince Port has also completed and waiting for takeover.

The state railways are planning on building rail connections to the Port of Güllük (via Çine) and to the Port of Ereğli, which TCDD serviced until 2004.

The ports TCDD owns are the most important in Turkey. The country's five largest ports are owned by the state railways. The Port of Haydarpaşa will soon be decommissioned, when the Marmaray project is complete.

Performance, market share, assets and financial results

Since 1950, the railway system's market share of freight transportation dropped from 70% to ≈55% (1960), ≈25% (1970), ≈10% (1980, 1990) and to less than 10% in 2000. A similar trend was observed in the percentage of passenger transport performed by rail – dropping from a share of greater than 40% in 1950 to ≈25% in 1960; less than 10% in 1970; ≈5% by 1980; and reaching an all-time low of 2% by 2000. This was partly due to major investment and expansion in the road network.

The TCDD receives subsidies from the government for socially necessary operations, but has registered increasing losses in all its areas of business except for port operations; which have high port tariffs (higher than 36%). By 2000, the cost to the Turkish government had exceeded $500 million per year in addition to a subsidy of over $100 million. In addition to the problems caused by the lack of investment from 1950 onwards, the TCDD organisation has been characterised as suffering from the common problems associated with state-owned enterprises; i.e. emphasis on production rather than customer needs; subject to government reliance and interference; and an inward-looking corporate culture.

As of 2008, the amount of freight transported was the highest ever (18.343 million tonne-kilometers); though actual growth was small over the previous 10 years, and passenger figures had risen slightly overall over the past decade.

As of 2008, the TCDD administers the Ankara Railway Factory, Sivas Concrete Sleeper factory, Afyon Concrete Sleeper factory, Behiçbey rail welding and track machinery repair factory and Çankırı Switch factory. Additionally, the state owned companies TÜLOMSAŞ,  and TÜVASAŞ are affiliates.

Rolling stock

Locomotives

Trainsets

Railcars

Passenger cars

Retired fleet

Locomotives

Trainsets

Railcars

Network

As of 2010, the railways consist of 763 tunnels, 25,441 bridges, 17 wyes and 7 loops. The railway's fleet consists of 467 main line Diesel locomotives, 67 Electric locomotives, 860 passenger coaches, 135 MUs, 33 High-speed rail sets and 15,384 freight cars. TCDD also owns 3 rail ferries.

Standards
 Rail Gauge – 1435 mm (4 ft 8 1⁄2 in)
 Electrification – 25 kV, 50 Hz AC Overhead lines
 Loading gauge – UIC GC
 Traffic – Right-Hand traffic
 Pantograph – 1950 mm (Old) and 1600 mm (New, Rebuilt and High-speed lines)
 Rail – UIC S49 (Old) and UIC 60 (New, Rebuilt and High-speed lines)
 Sleepers – Wooden and Steel (Old) and Concrete (New, Rebuilt and High-speed lines)
 Fastening – Baseplate based with Screw spikes (Old) and Tension Clamp (New, Rebuilt and High-speed lines)
 Platform height – 380 mm (Low platforms), 550 mm (High-speed trains' platforms) and 1050 mm (Commuter rail platforms)
 Coupling – Buffers and Chains (Locomotives and Passenger cars) and Scharfenberg (MUs)
 Brake – Air

Electrification

Turkey has chosen to electrify at the conventional 25 kV 50 Hz AC. The first electrified lines were the Istanbul suburban lines on the European side, from Sirkeci to Soğuksu, on 4 December 1955, and in the same period the E8000 electrical multiple units were taken into use. The suburban lines on the Asian side of Istanbul, from Haydarpaşa to Gebze, were electrified in 1969; while the Ankara suburban trains were electrified in 1972, on the line from Sincan to Kayaş.

On 6 February 1977 the tracks from Gebze to Adapazarı were made double track and electrified, allowing the first main line operation of electric trains in Turkey. The line from Arifiye outside Adapazarı to Eskişehir were further electrified in 1989 and in 1993 to Sincan, allowing electric train passages from Istanbul to Ankara. In 1994 the European lines from Istanbul to Edirne, Kapıkule and the Bulgarian border were also electrified. The same year the line from Divriği to İskenderun in eastern Turkey was also electrified, though this line is not connected to the rest of the electrified network. In 2006 the İzmir suburban system was also electrified.

Railway links with adjacent countries

West neighboring countries
  Bulgaria – open  –  – 25 kV, 50 Hz AC
  Greece – open  –  – 25 kV, 50 Hz AC (but no train runs since February 2011 due to the economic crisis in Greece)

East neighboring countries
  Georgia – open – break-of-gauge / at Akhalkalaki (Georgia; see the Baku–Tbilisi–Kars railway)
  Armenia – closed since 1993 – break-of-gauge / (see the Kars-Gyumri-Tbilisi railway line)
  Azerbaijan – no direct link – break-of-gauge / via Georgia open since 2017
  Iran – open, via Lake Van train ferry – 
  Iraq – no direct link, traffic routed via Syria – 
  Syria – closed because of the Syrian civil war –

Logistic centers
TCDD is constructing 18 logistic centers to be completed till 2023 to increase the portion of railway in freight transportation. These centers (also called as freight villages) will have railway connected container yards, cranes, warehouses, customs service and other facilities. These 18 logistic centers are:
Halkali, Samsun-Gelemen, Usak (completed)
Kosekoy-Izmit, Hasanbey-Eskisehir, Kaklik-Denizli, Bogazkopru-Kayseri (partially completed)
Yesilbayır-Istanbul, Gökköy-Balikesir, Bozüyük-Bilecik, Kayacık-Konya, Yenice-Mersin, Sivas, Türkoğlu-Kahramanmaraş, Kars, Palandöken-Erzurum, Mardin (under construction)

Yards and depots
TCDD owns and operates many facilities throughout Turkey. These facilities are; yards for storing freight and passenger cars, depots and locomotive shops for repair and maintenance and freight facilities for transferring or storing freight.

Güvercinlik Yard in central Ankara is the largest railway facility in Turkey. This multi-use facility includes a marshaling yard, passenger yard, 3 repair shops, for passenger cars, freight cars and locomotives, freight transfer terminal and a grain silo siding. The Haydarpaşa Yard is the second largest yard in Turkey, consisting of a freight yard, passenger yard, 3 maintenance shops for locomotives, passenger cars and freight cars, and a loop for trains.

Güvercinlik Yard in Ankara is the largest rail yard in Turkey.
Haydarpaşa Yard in İstanbul is the largest passenger yard in Turkey.
Etimesgut Yard in Ankara is the largest high-speed rail yard in Turkey (under construction).
Ispartakule Yard in İstanbul is a high-speed rail yard in Turkey (under planning).
Tüpraş loading facility is the largest freight yard in Turkey.
Halkalı logistics center is the largest multipurpose freight yard in Turkey (under re-construction).
Güvercinlik Maintenance Facility is the largest electrified maintenance facility in Turkey.
Halkapınar Maintenance Facility is the largest non-electrified maintenance facility in Turkey.
Eskişehir Railway Shops are the largest railway construction facility in Turkey.

Ferries

The Turkish State Railways own and operate two rail train ferries and connects to three others.

The most famous of these would be the Bosphorus train ferry in İstanbul. This ferry connects Haydarpaşa, on the Asian side, with Sirkeci, on the European side.  Demiryolu and Demiryolu II are the two ferries that operate on the route and are owned by TCDD.

By starting the project of Marmaray, TCDD ended the Bosphorus train ferry and announced an alternative ferry for the freight trains passing from Europe to Asia or vice versa: Tekirdağ-Derince Ferry. It's a private ferry named Erdemir working as a subcontractor of TCDD. Ferry did trials in 2012, and had started regular transportation at the end of 2013. Ferry has 5 lines with 800-meter total length.

The other train ferry owned by TCDD would be the Lake Van ferry, connecting Tatvan and Van via Lake Van, Turkey's largest lake. This ferry is a part of the only railway connection between Turkey and Iran, and thereby between Europe and India. Van is the name of the ferry that operates on the route and is also fully owned by TCDD.

Other train ferries:

Derince, Turkey to Chornomorsk, Ukraine – TCDD owns and operates the Port of Derince.
Zonguldak to Ereğli – Operated by Alyans Tempo Group.
 Samsun to Kavkaz – Operated by UPM.

Network extensions and modernizations
The Turkish State Railways currently has many network extension and modernization projects planned. TCDD is seeing the largest investment since the 1930s and with these investments is constructing new lines, primarily high-speed lines.

In addition to 5000 km high-speed line, Turkish Ministry of Transportation announced the construction of 4000 km new conventional rail lines as a part of 2023 strategy.

TCDD has also been renewing the existing lines, some to be electrified, signalized and/or made double tracked. The budget for renewals and infrastructure of existing lines is more than 1 billion TL in 2014.

There are also commuter rail projects (renewal or new lines) like Marmaray, İzban, Başkentray or Gaziray that are completed.

See also
 Transport organizations in Turkey
 General Directorate of Highways (Turkey) 
 Turkish State Railways
 TCDD Taşımacılık
List of countries by rail transport network size
List of countries by rail usage
 Turkish Airlines
 Transport in Turkey 
 Turkish State Highway System
 High-speed rail in Turkey
 Rail transport in Turkey
 Otoyol

References and notes

Notes

References

External links

 Turkish Railways Company Website
 Turkish Railway Company (TÜVASAŞ) Website
 A Short History of Turkish Railways including maps
 Turkish Railways Company Workers and Retired Personnel Social Aid Foundation
 Republic of Turkey Ministry of Culture – Ankara Railway Museum
 Republic of Turkey Ministry of Transport

 
Railway companies of Turkey
Transport operators of Turkey
Ottoman railways
Port operating companies
Government railway authorities
Railways
Turkish brands
Turkish companies established in 1927
Railway companies established in 1927
Government-owned railway companies
Companies based in Ankara